Courtelary railway station is a railway station in the municipality of Courtelary, in the Swiss canton of Bern. It is an intermediate stop on the standard gauge Biel/Bienne–La Chaux-de-Fonds line of Swiss Federal Railways.

Services
The following services stop at Courtelary:

 Regio: hourly service between La Chaux-de-Fonds and Biel/Bienne.

References

External links 
 
 

Railway stations in the canton of Bern
Swiss Federal Railways stations